The black-faced canary (Crithagra capistrata) is a species of finch in the family Fringillidae.
It is found in Angola, Burundi, Republic of the Congo, Democratic Republic of the Congo, Gabon, and Zambia.
Its natural habitats are subtropical or tropical moist lowland forest and subtropical or tropical moist shrubland.

The black-faced canary was formerly placed in the genus Serinus but phylogenetic analysis using mitochondrial and nuclear DNA sequences found that the genus was polyphyletic. The genus was therefore split and a number of species including the black-faced canary were moved to the resurrected genus Crithagra.

References

black-faced canary
Birds of Central Africa
black-faced canary
Taxonomy articles created by Polbot